Pioneer Middle School may refer to the following schools in the United States:

Pioneer Middle School (Tustin, California)
Pioneer Junior High School, Upland, California
Pioneer Middle School (Porterville, California)
Pioneer Middle School (Florida), a school in Cooper City, Florida
Pioneer Middle School (Washington), a school in the Steilacoom Historical School District in DuPont, Washington

See also
 Pioneer Ridge Middle School, Chaska, Minnesota
 Pioneer Trail Middle School, Olathe, Kansas
 Pioneer High School (disambiguation)